Local elections were held in Zambales on May 13, 2013, as part of the 2013 general election. Voters selected candidates for all local positions: a town mayor, vice mayor and town councilors, as well as members of the Sangguniang Panlalawigan, the vice-governor, governor and representatives for the Two districts of Zambales.

Provincial elections
The candidates for governor and vice governor with the highest number of votes wins the seat; they are voted separately, therefore, they may be of different parties when elected.

The Incumbent Governor Hermogenes "Jun" Ebdane is seeking for his reelection under the local party Sulong Zambales Party, His running mate is Incumbent Vice Gov. Ramon Lacbain. Gov. Ebdane is facing off former Gov. Amor Deloso of Liberal. In 2010, Ebdane won against to Deloso by a margin of 29,000. Deloso running mate is the daughter of Late Antonio M. Diaz, Rica Diaz Arambulo.

Gubernatorial election
Parties are as stated in their certificate of candidacies.

Vice-gubernatorial election

Congressional elections
Each of Zambales Two legislative districts will elect each representative to the House of Representatives. The candidate with the highest number of votes wins the seat.

1st District
Incumbent Mitos Magsaysay is term limited; she is running for the Senate; her son, Jesus Vicente II, known as Jobo, is her party's nominee. Jesus Vicente is facing off three termer Olongapo City Mayor James Gordon Jr. and former Subic Mayor Jeffrey Khonghun.

2nd District
Incumbent Jun Omar Ebdane succeeded Antonio M. Diaz in a special election when the latter died in 2011.

Provincial Board elections
All 2 Districts of Zambales will elect Sangguniang Panlalawigan or provincial board members.

1st District

|-bgcolor=black
|colspan=8|

|-

|-

2nd District

|-bgcolor=black
|colspan=8|

|-

|-

City and municipal elections
All cities and municipalities of Zambales will elect mayor and vice-mayor this election. The candidates for mayor and vice mayor with the highest number of votes wins the seat; they are voted separately, therefore, they may be of different parties when elected. Below is the list of mayoralty candidates of each city and municipalities per district.

1st District
City: Olongapo City
Municipalities: Castillejos, San Marcelino, Subic

Olongapo City
Incumbent Mayor James Gordon Jr. is term-limited; his wife former Vice Gov. Anne Gordon is his party's nominee. 
Anne opponents is vice mayor Rolen Paulino and Coun. Bugsy Delos Reyes

Castillejos
Jose Angelo Dominguez is the incumbent. His opponent is former Mayor Wilma Billman. In the 2010 election Dominguez won against Billman with a margin of 489 votes.

San Marcelino
Incumbent Mayor Jose Rodriguez is running unopposed.

Subic
Jay Khonghun is the incumbent. his opponent is coun. Ruben Gaduang.

2nd District
Municipalities: Botolan, Cabangan, Candelaria, Iba, Masinloc, Palauig, San Antonio, San Felipe, San Narciso, Santa Cruz

Botolan
Incumbent mayor Nerma Yap is running for vice mayor, her husband former mayor Rogelio Yap is her party's nominee.

Cabangan
Ronaldo Apostol is the incumbent.

Candelaria
Incumbent mayor Jean Moraña is term-limited and running for Board Member instead, Businessman Napoleon Edquid is her party's nominee.

Iba
Ad Hebert Deloso is the incumbent. his opponents is the son of Governor Jun Ebdane Provincial Administrator Rundy Ebdane.

Masinloc
Desiree Edora is the incumbent.

Palauig
Generoso Amog is the incumbent. his opponent is former Mayor and Incumbent Board Member Rosie Guatlo.

San Antonio
Estela Antipolo is the incumbent after Supreme Court proclaim her as mayor. In the 2010 election former Mayor Romeo Lonzanida won against Antipolo by margin of 268 votes, but Mayor Lonzanida was disqualified by the Comelec and Antipolo is only qualified candidate who garnered the highest number of votes and should be proclaimed mayor. Antipolo's opponents is incumbent Vice Mayor Efren Aratea and Leo Lonzanida.

San Felipe
Carolyn Fariñas is the incumbent.

San Narciso
Peter Lim is the incumbent. his opponents is coun. Sebastian Arichea and former Vice Mayor Joel Manangan.

Santa Cruz
Incumbent Luisito Marty is term limited, Civic leader Connie Marty is his party's nominee.

Elections in Zambales
2013 Philippine local elections